Greg Lowe (born in Pittsburgh) is a noted mountain climber, photographer, Academy Award nominated cinematographer, and co-founder of Lowe Alpine, along with his brothers Jeff and Mike Lowe.

Lowe invented the internal frame backpack. He established Lowe Alpine in his workshed in Colorado in 1967. In addition to backpacking gear Lowe is a pioneer in rock climbing hardware, developing some of the first cam-lever protection devices.

See also 
History of rock climbing
List of first ascents (sport climbing)

References

American rock climbers
Living people
Year of birth missing (living people)